Jakov was the Serbian Archbishop from 1286 to 1292. Information on Jakov is scarce; it is known that he renovated and founded churches, and that he likely transferred the episcopal see from Žiča to the Peć metochion. He had special love for the Studenica monastery, to which he provided liturgical books and church accessories. He had special care for Serbian ascetics. He received his aureola with his saintly purity and Christian love, he was gentle, humble and charitable. The Serbian Orthodox Church venerates him as Saint Jakov on February 3, in the Church calendar, while February 16, on the Gregorian calendar.

See also
 List of Serbian saints

Sources
Pakitibija.com, Житије срба светитеља: Свети Јаков архиепископ

13th-century Serbian people
13th-century Christian saints
13th-century Eastern Orthodox bishops
Serbian saints of the Eastern Orthodox Church
Archbishops of Serbs
Eastern Orthodox Christians from Serbia
Year of birth missing
1292 deaths